The Black Academy is a Canadian academy for the recognition of talent and fostering of Black Canadians in various industries. It is a division of B.L.A.C.K. Canada (Building a Legacy in Acting, Cinema + Knowledge), an organization founded by Canadian actors Shamier Anderson and Stephan James in 2020.

The organization has partnered with Insight Productions to launch an annual award ceremony to honour Black Canadian achievement in film, television, music, sports, and culture, tentatively planned to launch in 2022. The awards have already secured a commitment from the Canadian Broadcasting Corporation to broadcast the ceremony for at least the first three years, from 2022 through 2024. The first Legacy Awards were broadcast on September 25, 2022, with the honorees announced as Andre De Grasse, Kayla Grey and Fabienne Colas.

References

2020 establishments in Canada
Black Canadian organizations
Canadian awards